John Duncan Henderson (born March 25, 1933) is a Canadian former professional ice hockey goaltender

Career 
Henderson played 46 games for the Boston Bruins of the National Hockey League between 1954 and 1956. The rest of his career, which lasted from 1953 to 1961, and again from 1965 to 1970, was spent in various minor leagues. With the Whitby Dunlops he won the 1957 and 1959 Allan Cup, the senior championship of Canada.

Career statistics

Regular season and playoffs

References

External links
 

1933 births
Boston Bruins players
Canadian ice hockey goaltenders
Cleveland Barons (1937–1973) players
Kingston Frontenacs (EPHL) players
Living people
Oklahoma City Blazers (1965–1977) players
Ontario Hockey Association Senior A League (1890–1979) players
Pittsburgh Hornets players
San Francisco Seals (ice hockey) players
Ice hockey people from Toronto
Toronto Marlboros players
Victoria Maple Leafs players